Teenage Jesus is the debut DIY release from one-member synth-punk band The Emotron.

History
Teenage Jesus is the first album released by The Emotron. It was recorded in 2005 and released in 2006, and was the only The Emotron album to be released on Death By Karaoke. The album came about when The Emotron played with Chicago Synth-Pop Act The Mystechs, Singer/Label Owner Emil Hyde asked The Emotron if they would like to record and put out a DIY release on his label Death By Karaoke Records. In November 2005 The Emotron began recording Teenage Jesus in a home studio in North Georgia (U.S. state). The Album came out on The Mystechs and The Emotron tour in Mid 2006. Only 200 Copies of Teenage Jesus Were Made. All songs were written by Emil Hyde.

Track listing

Personnel
Kyle Knight - Vocals, Programming
Christopher Morris - Recording, Mixing
Emil Hyde - Production, Mixing

References

External links
 

2006 debut albums